Qareh Aqajlu (also Romanized as Qareh Āghājlū, Qarah Āghājlū, and Qareh Āqājl’ū; also known as Kara-Agach, Qara Aghāch, Qareh Āqāch, and Qareh Āqāchlū) is a village in Zanjanrud-e Pain Rural District, Zanjanrud District, Zanjan County, Zanjan Province, Iran. At the 2006 census, its population was 58, in 15 families.

References 

Populated places in Zanjan County